
Gmina Stężyca is a rural gmina (administrative district) in Ryki County, Lublin Voivodeship, in eastern Poland.

Villages
Gmina Stężyca contains the villages of Brzeźce, Brzeziny, Długowola, Drachalica, Kletnia, Krukówka, Nadwiślanka, Nowa Rokitnia, Paprotnia, Pawłowice, Piotrowice, Prażmów, Stara Rokitnia, Stężyca and Zielonka.

Neighbouring gminas
Gmina Stężyca is bordered by the town of Dęblin and by the gminas of Kozienice, Maciejowice, Ryki, Sieciechów and Trojanów.

References
Polish official population figures 2006

Stezyca
Ryki County